Argeș County is a county (județ) of Romania, in Muntenia, with the capital city at Pitești.

Demographics 

On 20 October 2011, it had a population of 612,431 and the population density was 89/km2.

 Romanians – 97%
 Roma (Gypsies) and other ethnic groups – 3%

Geography

This county has a total area of 6,862 km2.
The landforms can be split into 3 distinctive parts. In the north side there are the mountains, from the Southern Carpathians group – the Făgăraș Mountains with Moldoveanu Peak (2,544 m), Negoiu Peak (2,535 m) and Vânătoarea lui Buteanu peak (2,508 m) towering the region, and in the North-East part the Leaotă Mountains. Between them there is a pass towards Brașov, the Rucăr-Bran Passage. The heights decrease, and in the center there are the sub-carpathian hills, with heights around 800 m, crossed with very deep valleys. In the south there is the northern part of the Romanian Plain.

The main river that crosses the county is the Argeș River in which almost all the other rivers coming from the mountains flow. In the south the main rivers are the Vedea River and the Teleorman River.

Neighbours
Dâmbovița County in the east.
Vâlcea County and Olt County in the west.
Sibiu County and Brașov County in the north.
Teleorman County in the south.

Economy

The county is one of the most industrialized counties in Romania. There is one oil refinery and two automobile plants at Mioveni – the Dacia Renault car plant, and at Câmpulung the ARO plant.

The predominant industries in the county are:
 Automotive
 Chemical
 Electrical equipment
 Home appliances
 Food
 Textiles
 Construction materials

Oil is being extracted in the center and in the south. Also there are a few coal mines and close to Mioveni there is a nuclear research and production facility making nuclear fuels for the Cernavodă Nuclear Electric Power Plant. On the Argeș River there are a great number of hydroelectric power plants, the most impressive being the Vidraru power plant and dam.

The hillsides are well suited for wines and fruit orchards, and the south is suited for cereal crops.

Tourism
The main tourist destinations are:
 The city of Pitești
 The city of Curtea de Argeș, where one of the most well known monasteries in Romania is located
 The Câmpulung – Rucăr area
 The Făgăraș Mountains – the Transfăgărășan
 The Leaota Mountains
 The Poienari Castle
 The Cotmeana monastery.

Politics 

The Argeș County Council, renewed at the 2020 local elections, consists of 34 counsellors, with the following party composition:

Administrative divisions

Argeș County has 3 cities, 4 towns and 95 communes:
Municipalities
Câmpulung
Curtea de Argeș
Pitești – county seat; population: 148,264 (as of 2011)
Towns
Costești
Mioveni
Ștefănești
Topoloveni

Communes
Albeștii de Argeș
Albeștii de Muscel
Albota
Aninoasa
Arefu
Băbana
Băiculești
Bălilești
Bârla
Bascov
Beleți-Negrești
Berevoești
Bogați
Boteni
Boțești
Bradu
Brăduleț
Budeasa
Bughea de Jos
Bughea de Sus
Buzoești
Căldăraru
Călinești
Căteasca
Cepari
Cetățeni
Cicănești
Ciofrângeni
Ciomăgești
Cocu
Corbeni
Corbi
Coșești
Cotmeana
Cuca
Dâmbovicioara
Dârmanești
Davidești
Dobrești
Domnești
Drăganu
Dragoslavele
Godeni
Hârsești
Hârtiești
Izvoru
Leordeni
Lerești
Lunca Corbului
Mălureni
Mărăcineni
Merișani
Micești
Mihăești
Mioarele
Miroși
Morărești
Moșoaia
Mozăceni
Mușătești
Negrași
Nucșoara
Oarja
Pietroșani
Poiana Lacului
Poienarii de Argeș
Poienarii de Muscel
Popești
Priboieni
Râca
Rătești
Recea
Rociu
Rucăr
Sălătrucu
Săpata
Schitu Golești
Slobozia
Stâlpeni
Ștefan cel Mare
Stoenești
Stolnici
Șuici
Suseni
Teiu
Tigveni
Țițești
Uda
Ungheni
Valea Danului
Valea Iașului
Valea Mare-Pravăț
Vedea
Vlădești
Vulturești

Historical county

The county was located in the central-southern part of the Greater Romania, in the western part of the historic Muntenia region. Its territory comprised a large part of the current county, and a piece of the western part of the present Vâlcea County. It was bordered on the west by the counties of Olt and Vâlcea, to the north by the counties Făgăraș and Sibiu, to the east by the counties Muscel and Dâmbovița, and to the south by the counties Teleorman and Vlașca.

Administration

The county was originally (to 1925) divided administratively into five districts (plăși):
Plasa Argeș, headquartered at Curtea de Argeș
Plasa Dâmbovnic, headquartered at Rociu
Plasa Oltul, headquartered at Jiblea Veche
Plasa Teleorman, headquartered at Costești
Plasa Uda, headquartered at Uda

Subsequently, Plasa Uda was divided into two districts, and some territory was transferred from Plasa Oltul:Plasa Cuca, headquartered at Cuca, which town was formerly in Plasa Oltul
Plasa Pitești, headquartered at Pitești

Population 
According to the 1930 census data, the county population was 257,378 inhabitants, out of which 97.6% were ethnic Romanians. From the religious point of view, the population was 99.1% Eastern Orthodox, 0.3% Roman Catholic, 0.3% Jewish, as well as other minorities.

Urban population 
In 1930, the county's urban population was 26,341 inhabitants, comprising 90.4% Romanians, 2.2% Jews, 2.0% Hungarians, 1.7% Romanies, 1.1% Germans, as well as other minorities. From the religious point of view, the urban population was composed of 93.0% Eastern Orthodox, 2.4% Roman Catholic, 2.4% Jewish, 0.7% Reformed, 0.7% Lutheran, as well as other minorities.

References

 
Counties of Romania
Geography of Wallachia
1879 establishments in Romania
1938 disestablishments in Romania
1940 establishments in Romania
1950 disestablishments in Romania
1968 establishments in Romania
States and territories established in 1879
States and territories disestablished in 1938
States and territories established in 1940
States and territories disestablished in 1950
States and territories established in 1968